The  Dallas Cowboys season was the franchise's 53rd season National Football League (NFL), the fourth playing their home games at Cowboys Stadium and the second full season under head coach Jason Garrett. The Cowboys matched their win total from 2011, but missed the playoffs for a third consecutive season after losing their final game for the second straight season, this time to the Washington Redskins. Their 8–8 record was remarkable because the Cowboys trailed at some point during every game.

2012 draft class

Notes
The Cowboys traded their original first and second-round selections to the St. Louis Rams in order to move up in the first-round and select Morris Claiborne.

Staff

Rosters

Opening preseason roster

Week one roster

Final roster

Schedule

Preseason

Regular season

Note: Intra-division opponents are in bold text.

Game summaries

Week 1: at New York Giants

The Cowboys opened its 2012 campaign at MetLife Stadium in the Annual Kickoff Game against their NFC East foe, the defending Super Bowl champion New York Giants.  After a scoreless first quarter, the Giants picked up the season's first points as kicker Lawrence Tynes kicked a 22-yard field goal in the second quarter.  Dallas would close out the half with quarterback Tony Romo finding wide receiver Kevin Ogletree on a 10-yard touchdown pass.

In the third quarter, the Cowboys added onto its lead. Romo hooked up with Ogletree again with a 40-yard touchdown pass.  New York answered with a 10-yard run from running back Ahmad Bradshaw, yet Dallas responded in kind with a 33-yard field goal from kicker Dan Bailey.  The Cowboys pulled away for good in the fourth quarter with Romo connecting with wide receiver Miles Austin on a 34-yard touchdown pass.  The Giants closed out the game with quarterback Eli Manning completing a 9-yard touchdown pass to former Dallas tight end Martellus Bennett.

With the win, the Cowboys began the season at 1–0.

Week 2: at Seattle Seahawks

With the huge loss, the Cowboys fell to 1–1.

Week 3: vs. Tampa Bay Buccaneers

Hoping to rebound from their tough road loss to the Seattle Seahawks, the Cowboys returned to Arlington to host their home opener against the Tampa Bay Buccaneers, a team that they had blown out a year before. This game, however, was a close one throughout. In the first quarter, Cowboys quarterback Tony Romo tossed an interception to Aqib Talib, which set up for a 1-yard touchdown pass from Tampa Bay quarterback Josh Freeman to tight end Luke Stocker for Tampa Bay to take the first lead. Dallas would immediately respond after a Sean Lee interception set up Cowboys running back DeMarco Murray for an 11-yard touchdown run to tie the game. Shortly before the half, kicker Dan Bailey booted a 32-yard field goal for Dallas to take the lead, 10–7. After a scoreless third quarter, Dallas pulled away with Dan Bailey knocking in a pair of field goals, one from 26 yards and another from 22 yards to make the game 16–7. Tampa Bay attempted a furious rally to take the game back after a 28-yard field goal by Connor Barth, but Dallas would recover the following onside kick and effectively took a knee to end the game.

With the victory, Dallas improved their season to 2–1.

Week 4: vs. Chicago Bears

With the loss, the Cowboys enter their bye week with 2–2.  Dallas quarterback Tony Romo had a horrifically forgettable game, tossing 5 interceptions, including 2 that were run back for touchdowns by the ferocious Bears defense.

Week 6: at Baltimore Ravens

With the loss, the Cowboys fell into 2–3 and dropped to 0–4 all-time against the Ravens.  Horrible clock management by head coach Jason Garrett on the final drive left Dallas' kicker with a 50+ yard field goal attempt that he pushed wide as time expired.

Week 7: at Carolina Panthers

The Cowboys beat the Panthers to improve to a .500 record.

Week 8: vs. New York Giants

With the loss, the Cowboys fell to 3–4 on the season and 0–4 at Cowboys Stadium against the Giants.  A late go-ahead touchdown catch by Dez Bryant was overturned on review as it showed that as Bryant's hand came down to brace his landing, barely a tip of one finger came down on the end line, thus ruling him out of bounds.

Week 9: at Atlanta Falcons

During this game, Jason Witten's 7 receptions brought him to a franchise record of 754, surpassing Michael Irvin's previous record of 750.

With the loss, the Cowboys fell to 3–5.

Week 10: at Philadelphia Eagles

With the win, the Cowboys improved to 4–5.

Week 11: vs. Cleveland Browns

After being down 13–0 against the Browns in the first half, the Cowboys outscored the Browns 20–7 to send the game into overtime.  The Cowboys kicked the game-winning field goal and improved to 5–5 on the season and 2nd place in the NFC East.

Week 12: vs. Washington Redskins
Thanksgiving Day game

With the loss to their long-time rival the Washington Redskins during a Thanksgiving Day showdown, the Cowboys dropped to 5–6 on the season and 6–1 against the Redskins on Thanksgiving. Along with the loss, the Cowboys also lost 2 key defensive players for an extended period of time. Cornerback Orlando Scandrick broke his left hand, but the team was still hopeful that he would be able to return before the end of the season. But of the three injuries suffered during the game, Bruce Carter's was probably the most devastating. Carter dislocated his left elbow during the game and was out for the rest of the season after having surgery. At that point, the Cowboys had lost 4 starters on defense due to injuries, and were on their 3rd and 4th string middle linebackers after losing both Carter and Sean Lee for the season. Also the Cowboys lost starting receiver Miles Austin to a hip strain caused by linebacker London Fletcher in the back of the end zone. Although he did not return to the game, he was cleared to play for the Cowboys' week 13 game.

Week 13: vs. Philadelphia Eagles

Week 14: at Cincinnati Bengals

Week 15: vs. Pittsburgh Steelers

Week 16: vs. New Orleans Saints
 The loss dropped Dallas to 8–7 and mathematically eliminated them from gaining a wild card spot. However, if they were to beat the Washington Redskins in week 17, Dallas would win the NFC East.

Week 17: at Washington Redskins
 With the loss, Dallas ended the season with an 8–8 record, and missed the playoffs for the third straight season. The Cowboys loss marks their third season finale loss in the last five seasons where they faced a win-or-go-home situation for the playoffs.  All those season finale games came against NFC East opponents. In 2008, they lost 44–6 to the Philadelphia Eagles failing to clinch a wild card spot. In 2011, they lost 31–14 to the New York Giants failing to win the NFC East title.  The loss also brought their record in Week 17 games to 2–11 since 2000.

Season recap
The Cowboys started the season on September 5, playing a Wednesday game for the first time in franchise history.

Against the Philadelphia Eagles on November 11 during the fourth quarter, the Cowboys became the second team in NFL history to score touchdowns via interception, fumble return and punt return in the same quarter. The first one was the San Francisco 49ers in 1966.

Standings

Footnotes
 The Week 17 game was originally going to be aired on Fox which, due to playoff implications, competed with NBC for the slot. The game was ultimately moved to NBC.

References

External links
 
 
 Team Column

Dallas
Dallas Cowboys seasons
Dallas
2010s in Dallas